Karl Saral (5 February 1880 Kuigatsi Parish, Tartu County – 16 June 1942 Krivosheino District, Tomsk Oblast, Russia) was an Estonian politician. He was a member of Estonian Provincial Assembly. From 27 November 1918 to 3 February 1919 he was Second Assistant Chairman of the assembly.

References

1880 births
1942 deaths
Members of the Estonian Provincial Assembly